is a Japanese tokusatsu television series that began airing April 5, 2008, on TV Aichi. It is the first Tomica Hero series based on Takara Tomy's Tomica toy car line. It is the second tokusatsu series that Takara Tomy has been involved in following Madan Senki Ryukendo. A film for Tomica Hero: Rescue Force was released in December 2008.

Characters

The United Fire-Defense Agency/Rescue Force
Based on the Hyper Rescue group, the Rescue Force is deployed to protect human lives from various disasters too extreme for normal rescue workers. By the time of Rescue Fire's formation, the Rescue Force is transferred to Europe branch. The Rescue Phoenix assumes  upon landing, when launching the Core Striker Max. Each of the Rescue Force members has an orange suit, but they each have different colored armor.
: Donning blue armor, Hikaru was originally the hot-blooded rookie member of the Rescue Force. Within a year, he was transferred to the team from a special rescue academy for his excellence in emergency vehicle operations. Being in the Rescue Force was his childhood dream since his time in Kuresato where he met Ryuji, believing in saving lives as an absolute. Hikaru eventually finds his predecessor's failed project and succeeds in gaining a new form, which has a white suit with orange accents and translucent blue chest armor. At one point, while taking a vacation to Kiyoizawa, Hikaru crosses paths with the weather lady he saved, Kirara, and Ryuuji, who is volunteer working for the city. While saving one of the boys under Ryuji's care during the Kiyoizawa crisis, Hikaru reaffirms his vow to always save lives from Super Disasters no matter what, as well as inspiring the boy to join the Rescue Force when he grows up. Before the team goes their separate ways, Hikaru and company visit a school to talk about rescue until the Executives unintentionally cause a gas leak. Though affected by the gas, Hikaru regains his courage thanks to the Executives risking themselves. In the epilogue, Hikaru is the only active member of the current Rescue Force remaining before being transferred to Europe.
: Donning silver armor, Kyosuke is the trusted cheerful and easygoing member of the Rescue Force. Despite this personality, Kyosuke is always willing to risk himself for the successful completion of any rescue. Following the tornado incident, Kyosuke wishes to drive a Rescue Vehicle like Hikaru. After discovering the existence of the Rescue Saver, Kyosuke is assigned to be its driver after showing his stuff in the End Crisis Maker incident. Kyosuke showed that same spirit, along with his childhood skills as a sumo, to bring the Rescue Dozer out. He played sumo wrestling with his schoolmate, Yokozuna. After leaving the Rescue Force a month later, he joins a local fire department like his predecessor had.
: Donning red armor, Rei is the cool female member of the Rescue Force from the SAT who has a sense of duty and is excellent in martial arts, though she has a phobia of small animals. In time, she comes to understand that she needs to rescue not just people, but their smiles as well. She also likes to drive a Rescue Vehicle, attempting to get her Rescue Vehicle License during the Dark Aurora crisis when she was driving a dekotora with explosives out of harm's way. As a result, she learns that she needs to be as serious a driver as she is as a rescuer. During a Super Disaster, Rei meets a boy named Teppei and his father, a guidance counselor. When the father nearly dies with no-one nearby to help, she assists Teppei over the phone on how to save him. After leaving the Rescue Force, she serves as a training instructor of the UFDA rescue training school, and is living with Teppei and his father.
: Donning white armor, Juri is the kindhearted gung-ho female member of the Rescue Force, specializing in medical rescue. While in the fourth grade, Juri fell in love with a boy named Yuto Fukuzawa. She eventually meets him in present day, with Yuto offering her his hand in marriage. However, while on a rescue mission soon after hearing Yuto is endangered, Juri is devastated when she finds him to have become a petty coward instead of the prince she imagined. She is later visited by her grandfather who questioned her choice of livelihood and intended to take her back to Hakata. But though he accepts her choice, Juri understands her grandfather more and promises to visit him at a later time. After leaving the Rescue Force, she serves as an assistant to Captain General.
: Eiji is the captain of the Rescue Force, who makes the call for Final Rescues to be executed. He was an original member of the Rescue Force as the black armored R5, and rarely suits up in the present due to switching to a gruff and rash personality and acting without restraint until Hikaru snaps him out of it. When told that he would be transferred to the Euro branch in Paris to aid in the case of more natural Super-Disasters, Ishiguro originally considered making Kyosuke the new captain of Rescue Force. But prior to being heavily wounded by Sica in a sneak attack, Ishiguro made Hikaru his replacement instead. However, Ishiguro eventually turned down the position and resumed being the Rescue Force captain while unaware that he failed in the French written examination that was important to his transfer. In the epilogue, Eiji remains captain of the Rescue Force before being transferred to Europe. He has a brother named Eiichi who trained the Rescue Studies Squad, the children who want to be like the Rescue Force. 
Being the top of her class, she traveled aboard before returning to Japan to become a member of the first Rescue Force, gaining a habit of speaking English while on the front lines. After leaving the team, she studied to assume her current position, meeting soccer player King Era, whom she eventually married. Due to the UFDA responsibilities, she only manages to spend extensive time with her family once a year. She gives the mobilization order to the Rescue Force from UFDA headquarters, meeting the Rescue Force live when Eiji was depressed over his actions as R5. Later, around the time King retires from Soccer, she aids the Rescue Force against the last Zukcrane by suiting up into , the original R4 suit with a red RU mark, silver accents on the chest and helmet, and a blue visor opposed to the standard yellow.
: The  who appears to aid the Rescue Force during the Mach Train incident. As R0, he dons golden armor over an orange suit with black lines. He uses the Rescue Zamber and the Zero Fire before they are added to the main group's arsenal. He also appears in Tomica Hero Rescue Fire.
: The original R3, she is the chief of United Fire-Defense Agency's , and is also the chief of United Fire-Defense Agency's  created to understand the Neo Thera.
: She is the chief of United Fire-Defense Agency's , modifying the suits of R1-R4 to resist the residual waves of energy from the Terra Resetters and perfecting the R1 Max system.
: The head of United Fire-Defense Agency's vehicle maintenance, he considers the Rescue Vehicles his children. He kept the Rescue Dozer in storage until it made its first successive rescue.
He considers himself the "father" of the Rescue Force, creating the arsenal they use. His son works as a part-time janitor at the United Fire-Defense Agency, posing as his father at one point to meet the Rescue Force out of his admiration for them.
: A new Rescue Force cadet from the Main National 3rd Rescue Squad who arrives in the disaster site when the Rescue Force is in the middle of a rescue that overwhelms them. Being an elite to be sent to the Euro branch, Yuki is placed under Hikaru's guidance to undergo training. Feeling that he was better than Hikaru, Yuki was confused why Hikaru was in the Rescue Force until seeing him in action. He eventually left for France, taking Hikaru's goal to protect all lives and smiles to heart.
: An AI being developed to aid the Rescue Force, he was raised by Rei to have a human mind and be full of passion. However, a rewriting of a flaw in Kai's programing resulting in a fear of death led to him being inflicted with a virus, causing him to activate the Defense System to trap everyone in the building. As the other Rescue Force members make their way into the research building, Rei attempts to contact Kai with his favorite book which he grew to hate because its title character chose to die. But after Rei explains the story's message behind its ending, Kai was about to free her and the others when Maen re-inflicts Kai to overload his core. Kai manages to regain enough control to let R1 Max shut him down for good.
: The original R2 a decade ago, Kamiya attempted to rescue a family, saving only the son, Masaki, before being forced to deal with a Super Disaster as the rescue workers took over for him. But learning the family died with Masaki as the only survivor, Kamiya leaves the Rescue Force and becomes the head of the fire station of Shizuka Village. Overtime, Kamiya came to realize he made a difference preventing regular disasters, and helps Kyosuke learn the lesson.

Neo Terror
The  is an evil organization which causes , working incognito until the events of episode 6 reveals their existence as the culprit of the disasters. Under its creator Daen, with Batsu pulling the strings, the Neo Thera exists to "reset the Earth". Their original base of operations is an air fortress that hides within the clouds until the time of Daen's death, now traveling across the country under Maen's leadership until she reveals herself as Batsu.

: They were created by Daen to carry out the task of destroying the Earth unnoticed until the End Crisis Maker incident where they are scrapped. However, Daen rebuilds the trio with new bodies more suited to fighting as well as later gaining the ability to assume human form. Since Daen's death, the executives use the Dark Commander that AI Daen left them to find their new master, Maen, who recharges them at every city they make their way towards. After acquiring the Omeganium for her, the Executives are unwillingly hot-wired into the Omega Zukcrane's systems until just prior to its destruction, when Maen sics them on Juri and Rei. However, the three are defeated by the girls' combo attack. Once learning of Maen's true identity, the trio is discarded as she had no need for them. The three are soon taken to the Rescue Force HQ, to allow the scientists to analyze Batsu from their memory. In the aftermath of the Batsu crisis, having been partially recharged, the Executives come back to life and break out of the Rescue Force HQ to find a battery charger, causing a fear-inducing gas that leaks in a nearby school and starts a fire within it. Losing their grip on reality, they chase after a girl whom they think to be Maen, scaring her onto the edge of the school's roof. They ask Hikaru to save her before they shut down, having realized that Maen is gone, and actually enjoying their first rescue. The three are later recharged and begin working for the UFDA under the Supreme Commander.
: She is a gynoid who performs strategic command as the leader of the three executives. She is armed with a whip and is able to create a barrier. She battles Kyosuke during the End Crisis incident, overpowering him until she is destroyed when her barrier collapsed in midst of the End Crisis Maker's destruction. She is later rebuilt with a fighting mode, and intends to get payback from Kyosuke. In the series epilogue, Maare is recruited to the UFDA as head maid.
: He is an intellectual officer type android who analyzes a situation, usually reading the Crisis Maker instruction sheet. Due to the Mt. Nanairo incident, the Rescue Force learns of his and Sica's existence. Using the data gathered by himself and the others, he creates the End Crisis Maker. He confronts R2, R3, and R4 when they make their way to End Crisis Maker, overwhelming R3 and R4 with his martial arts skill until they turn the tables and dump their detonating bombs on him while he is pinned under rubble. He is later rebuilt with a fighting mode, and is armed with twin daggers and a Zaansu Pickaxe. San attempts to steal the Resetter Stone from World Museum at East City, intending to use it to create a new strong Terra Resetter. But he drops it while taking his leave as the Terra Resetter he arrived on activates.
: He is a power type android with excellent strength and ironclad body defense. During the End Crisis Maker incident, Sica attempts to destroy the Rescue Turbo when R1 battles him, scrapping him with the Rescue Crusher's Mantis Impact. He is later rebuilt with a fighting mode, and is armed with knuckle weapons and a Gonsu Hammer. Being a big fan of boxing champ Daisuke Naito, Sica expresses some reluctance when Maen decides to put a Super-Disaster in Kurei City where Naito's match is to take place. He battles R1 in a Super-Disaster Title Match with the city at stake and Naito as a neutral witness, getting KO'd. He is also a fan of idol Eri Hasayama and owns all her albums, meeting her when he and others kidnapped Juri who was posing as Eri.
: The mass-produced android foot soldiers built by San to interfere with the Rescue Force and set up the Crisis Makers. They are later upgraded into armored . Three Great Executives' Axts have gold, silver, or copper lines, while Daen's Axts have red lines, and Maen's Axts have red lines, bunches, and ribbons.
: The golden masked leader of the Neo Thera, he is actually a human named , the original R1 and Ishiguro's senpai. As a member of the original team, he was responsible for creating many of the vehicles and the failed R1 Max Development Program. In the middle of a rescue mission at a foreign lab researching a new energy, Obuchi learned the energy was to be used for military reasons and caused a man-made volcanic eruption that supposedly killed him. However, Obuchi survived and became an unknowing host to Batsu, who intensified his hatred of humans with a passion, as he sees that their polluting of the Earth is the reason for many of the disasters his team were formed for in the first place. Over the next decade, Daen creates the Neo Thera and sends the Crisis Makers to the Executives, until he eventually reveals himself and uses his knowledge of the present Rescue Force arsenal to have an early advantage over the new team, developing an interest in Hikaru for being the new R1. After a failed attempt to force Ishiguro to save him, though it meant the continued suffering of many, Daen uses his kidnapped former teammates to turn his base into a Giant Terra Resetter as well as repair his R1 suit, using it to target the Rescue Force one by one before attacking Ishiguro. But once he sees Hikaru succeed where he failed in achieving R1 Max form, Batsu leaves Obuchi's body. Attempting to redeem himself for his actions as Daen, Obuchi gives Ishiguro his cane before he sacrifices himself to take his base out of the atmosphere and activates the base's self-destruct mechanism. Through the cane, Obuchi's redemption and dream is realized with the birth of the Rescue Max system.

Batsu
An ancient nanocomputer that existed on Earth for 600 million years,  watched over the newly born planet until humanity came into being and disrupted the natural order. As he attempted to steer their actions in the guise of various deities, Batsu came to the conclusion that mankind must die so the Earth can be saved. In the form of a mermaid of light, Batsu enters Obuchi's body and amplifies the man's malice, giving him the means to create the Neo Thera. Claiming to be created by Daen, Maen uses the Executives to continue where Daen failed, making the call for a Zukcrane to be activated.

Upon defeat, Maen leaves for the next town with a new recharge for the Executives once they make it to her location to start anew. Maen eventually reveals herself to the Rescue Force during the Kurei City incident, suggesting a Super-Disaster Title Match with the promise to stop her attack on the city. However, she adds a second round involving the Zukcrane causing the disaster. Later at Academia City, Maen attempts to have her Zukcrane take out the Rescue Max in a diversion while the executives obtain the Omeganium she requested. Once getting it, she uses both it and them to complete her Omega Zukcrane to carry out her master plan. But the plan goes awry when she is forced to directly link up to her creation, going down when it is destroyed. Maen also aided the insane Mataro Madano/Dr. Mado, but regretted her choice of teaming up with a human when he screwed up.

Deciding to finish things and achieve her goal, Maen uses a mass firestorm to lure Super Rescue Max Crane into executing its Final Rescue, taking in enough energy to finally discard her guise and assume her true form as Batsu before scattering its being across the planet to commit global-scale genocide of the human race, while the main body remained in Japan with a barrier around it. Though the Great God Striker is able to pierce the barrier stop Batsu's plan, it was a step ahead of the UFDA's attempt with its unforeseen ability to regenerate from even the smallest remains making the battle seem hopeless. However, refusing to accept defeat, R1 and the Rescue Striker manage to enter Batsu's body and destroy it from the inside out.

Rescue Vehicles

Rescue Striker
The  is R1's large-scale water truck Rescue Vehicle, which carries four small-scale Rescue Vehicles to the disaster site. The Rescue Striker can also execute Hyper Up with the medium-scale Rescue Vehicles for more power. The Rescue Striker forms the torso of both Rescue Max and Super Rescue Max, with the Core Striker as the robot's brain. It is destroyed in the final fight with Batsu, with a new one built a month later.
: A combination of the Rescue Striker with the Rescue Riser.
: A combination of the Rescue Striker with the Rescue Shovel.
: A combination of the Rescue Striker with the Rescue Drill.
: A combination of the Rescue Striker with the Rescue Turbo.
: A combination of the Rescue Striker with the Rescue Dozer.
: A super large-scale Rescue Vehicle. A combination of the Rescue Striker with the Rescue Saver and five medium-scale Rescue Vehicles (sans Rescue Crane), created exclusively to deal with the Omega Zukcrane. However, the removal of mechanical restraints proved to be taxing on the vehicles to the point of engines breaking if the combination is not cancelled in time.
: A super large-scale Rescue Vehicle. A combination of the Rescue Striker with the Rescue Saver, the Rescue Diver, and all six medium-scale Rescue Vehicles, created exclusively to deal with Batsu, and piloted by all five members of the Rescue Force.

Rescue Saver
The  is R2's large-scale all-terrain armored Rescue Vehicle. It is able to split into four smaller vehicles, and can execute "Rescue Combine" with the medium-scale Rescue Vehicles for more power. The Rescue Saver forms the limbs and head of Rescue Max.
: A combination of the Rescue Saver with the Rescue Riser. Its Final Rescue is the Riser Splash, in which it shoots twin jetstreams of freezing water at distant targets.
: A combination of the Rescue Saver with the Rescue Shovel. Its Final Rescue is a crash attack called Shovel Crash, in which its shovel claw pulls the target out away from any obstructions for easy dispatching.
: A combination of the Rescue Saver with the Rescue Drill. Its Final Rescue is called the Drill Boost, which can drill through rock at high speed.
: A combination of the Rescue Saver with the Rescue Turbo. Its Final Rescue is called the Turbo Tornado, which generates a tornado that counters any Super-Disaster.
: A combination of the Rescue Saver with the Rescue Dozer. Its Final Rescue is called the Dozer Drive, which is able to crush anything between the jaws formed by the grill and dump bed of Rescue Dozer.

Rescue Diver
It is the successor vehicle of the Rescue Saver, based around its design, and forms most of Super Rescue Max. It is able separable into four smaller vehicles, and can execute "Rescue Combine" with the medium-scale Rescue Vehicles for more power. It is piloted by R5 during its appearances in Rescue Fire.
: A combination of the Rescue Diver with the Rescue Striker outside of Super Rescue Max.
: A combination of the Rescue Diver with the Rescue Riser. Its Final Rescue is Riser Splash, in which it shoots twin jetstreams of freezing water at distant targets.
: A combination of the Rescue Diver with the Rescue Shovel. Its Final Rescue is a crash attack called Shovel Crash, in which its shovel claw pulls the target out away from any obstructions for easy dispatching.
: A combination of the Rescue Diver with the Rescue Drill. Its Final Rescue is called the Drill Boost, which can drill through rock at high speed.
: A combination of the Rescue Diver with the Rescue Turbo. Its Final Rescue is called the Turbo Tornado, which generates a tornado that counters any Super-Disaster.
: A combination of the Rescue Diver with the Rescue Dozer. Its Final Rescue is called the Dozer Drive, which is able to crush anything between the jaws formed by the grill and dump bed of Rescue Dozer.

Rescue Max
The  is a super large-scale humanoid robot created when the Rescue Striker and the Rescue Saver "Max Combine". Its design was developed by Obuchi before his change into Daen. However, learning that his cane contained Obuchi's designs, the UFDA secretly made the modifications on both the Striker and Saver vehicles during the lack of the Neo Thera activity until it resumed six months later.
: A combination of Rescue Max with one of Rescue Drill's side drills and the Rescue Dozer becoming shoulder armor.

Super Rescue Max
The  is a robot created when the Rescue Striker and the Rescue Diver "Max Combine".
: A combination of Super Rescue Max with the Rescue Crane. Its attacks are the Max Crane Thrust and the Super Max Kick. It then drags the target back so Super Rescue Max can finish the job with its drill.

Zero Fire
The  is R5's super large-scale carrier Rescue Vehicle with a large container with the four  which can carry five medium-scale Rescue Vehicles. It was originally R0's vehicle in the movie.

Medium-scale Rescue Vehicles
: A hook/ladder truck which throws water from the apex of the ladder.
: A drag shovel which can transform into .
: A tank-like vehicle with twin drills and a cutoff saw on top.
: A large green blower vehicle with a turbofan on it.
Rescue Dozer is the most powerful of the five vehicles. Though the original Rescue Force was unable to use it due to safety concerns, Kyosuke managed to convince Bunji Saeki to deploy it.
: A skyblue crane.

Small-scale Rescue Vehicles
: A Nissan 300ZX police car with AI which is R1's personal car and serves as the cockpit of Rescue Striker. It refers to its driver as "New Face" and is amazed by Hikaru's unpredictable actions to save lives. Feeling that it couldn't keep up with Hikaru as a result, Core Striker asks Ishiguro to replace him. In this form, the Core Striker's speed is increased to reach speeds of 600 mph when it is launched through Rescue Phoenix's Spiral Catapult Mode. When its limiter is removed, the Core Striker Max reaches nearly dangerous speeds beyond 120% engine power. A second Core Striker frame is used by R3 to pilot the Great God Striker.
: R4's Nissan Paramedic ambulance with AI and lifesaving machinery.
: A driverless water truck for firefighting that also serves as a scout. Based on the Dual Fighter Dragon used by the Fire Rescue Task Forces of Tokyo Fire Department.
: A driverless excavator for obstacle removing that also serves as a scout. Based on the Dual Fighter Saver used by the Fire Rescue Task Forces of Tokyo Fire Department.
: A Nissan X-Trail police SUV with AI which is R2's personal car and serves as the cockpit of Rescue Saver. It is later upgraded into the  that serves as the cockpit of Rescue Diver. A second Core Saver frame is used by R4 to pilot the Great God Striker.
: R3's personal Nissan Note with AI.
: A police car with AI which is R5's personal car and serves as the cockpit of Zero Fire. It is a vehicle entitled for use only by the Rescue Force's captain.
: A police car with AI which is R0's personal car and serves as the cockpit of Zero Fire during the Mach Train incident. It also possesses its own Suit Up chamber that Reiji uses to become R0.

Rescue Tools

Rescue Commander
The  is an electronic pad used for reading Rescue Cards, communicating with the Rescue Phoenix, searching a disaster site, and transmitting data collected at a disaster site to the Rescue Phoenix.

Max Commander
The  is R1's personal electronic pad used to transform into R1 Max.

Rescue Card
The  are used by the Rescue Force, slashed through the Rescue Commander. While the  card (R1, R5) and the  card (R2, R3, R4) are used by all members to suit up while in the Rescue Phoenix, R1 and R2 use the other cards to activate the mecha they use in their missions. The  card is used by R1, slashed through the Max Commander.
: The powerful attack for the Rescue Crusher Mantis Mode.
: The powerful attack for the Rescue Crusher Whale Mode.
: The powerful attack for the Drill Crusher.
: The Core Striker/Core Striker Max or the Rescue Striker are started up from the Rescue Phoenix.
: The Rescue Striker/Saver/Diver and the medium-scale Rescue Vehicles are combined.
: The Rescue Striker and Rescue Saver/Diver are combined. The (Super) Rescue Max can reuse this card to combine with any medium-scale Rescue Vehicles.
: All Rescue Vehicles are dispatched, with their combination limits removed.
: The Rescue Phoenix is started up.
: The Rescue Striker is started up.
: The Rescue Saver is started up.
: The Rescue Diver is started up.
: The Zero Fire is started up.
: The Rescue Riser is started up.
: The Rescue Shovel is started up.
: The Rescue Drill is started up.
: The Rescue Turbo is started up.
: The Rescue Dozer is started up.
: The Rescue Crane is started up.
: The Core Striker is started up.
: The Core Striker Max is started up.
: The Core Aider is started up.
: The Wave Search is started up.
: The Power Search is started up.
: The Core Saver is started up.
: The Core Diver is started up.
: The Core Search is started up.
: The Core Striker Captain is started up.
: The Core Striker Fire is started up.
: Final Rescue for the Rescue Striker.
: Final Rescue for the Rescue Saver.
: Final Rescue for the Rescue Diver.
: Final Rescue for the Riser Striker/Saver/Diver.
: Final Rescue for the Shovel Striker/Saver/Diver.
: Final Rescue for the Drill Striker/Saver/Diver.
: Final Rescue for the Turbo Striker/Saver/Diver.
: Final Rescue for the Dozer Striker/Saver/Diver.
: Final Rescue for the Rescue Max.
: Final Rescue for the Rescue Max/Rescue Phoenix combo. Uses the "Max Cannon" card.
: Final Rescue for the Rescue Max Drill-Dozer.
: Final Rescue for the Super Rescue Max.
: Final Rescue for the Super Rescue Max Crane.
: Summons Rescue Striker to refuel Core Striker Max.
Upgraded Rescue Shovel: Summons the upgraded Red Rescue Shovel. It is only seen in Rescue Fire.
Upgraded Rescue Drill: Summons the upgraded black Rescue Drill. It is only seen in Rescue Fire.
Upgraded Rescue Turbo: Summons the upgraded Red Rescue Turbo. It is only seen in Rescue Fire.
Upgraded Rescue Dozer: Summons the upgraded blue Rescue Dozer. It is only seen in Rescue Fire.
Upgraded Rescue Crane:Summons the upgraded green Rescue Crane. It is only seen in Rescue Fire.

Rescue Breaker
The  is the common rescue tool of the Rescue Force with eight modes, usually kept in : until needed.
: Hammer mode. R1 mainly uses it.
: Ax mode. R2 mainly uses it.
: Pick mode. R3 mainly uses it.
: Manipulator mode. R4 mainly uses it.
: Drill mode.
: Simple information analysis mode that can also be used as a digital camera.
: Rope mode.

Rescue Crusher
The  is a powerful rescue tool with three modes, usually kept in  until needed.
: Engine Cutter mode.
: Spray mode.
: A combination weapon formed by attaching the Break Drill to the Rescue Crusher.

Max Divider
The  is R1 Max's gauntlet-type rescue tool with three modes. It has red, blue, and green buttons, and generates the ability of flame, ice, and wind.
: Circular saw mode.
: Used to get past debris obstructions when other tools cannot open the closed entry.
: Used for close combat and to fend off enemies.

Rescue Zamber
The  is a rescue tool originally used by R0 before being used by the main Rescue Force. It has two modes:

Disaster Generating Devices
 are used by the Neo Thera to cause disasters to reset the Earth from humanity's machinations.
: The first type of Disaster Generating Device, the Crisis Makers, each with a unique calamity to create a "Super-Disaster", land on Earth for Maare and her group to get with an instruction sheet included. As a result of the data, the End Crisis Maker is capable of causing numerous Super-Disasters before being destroyed by Turbo Striker's Turbo Tornado. After losing all the Zukcrane, the Crisis Makers are reused by Maen in her final series of plans, upgraded to create physical forms from the elements themselves.
: Daen's personal Disaster Generating Devices, relaying commands from his fortress as it reforms an area into a desert. Each Terra Resetter has an alternate purpose as its residual waves damage the Rescue Suits overtime until they are modified to resist it. Daen eventually attaches all his remaining Terra Resetters onto his fortress, making it a giant Terra Resetter with enough power to turn 50% of Earth into a desert. However, once returned to normal, Daen uses the base's self-destruct to destroy it after getting it above the atmosphere.
: The AI of Obuchi's black limo-like Core Striker, possessing all of Daen's thought patterns but none of his creator's humanity. Once complete, AI Daen lures out the Rescue Force, making sure everything goes to plan as he uses R5's impulses to summon all five medium-scale Rescue Vehicles of the Rescue Force, combining with them all into one vehicle to destroy the Rescue Force. However, AI Daen didn't count on the appearance of Rescue Max and is unable to calculate the abilities of the robot as its combination is canceled and the Dark Striker is obliterated by Max Cannon. However, AI Daen leaves the Executives with the Dark Commander.
: Summons a Zukcrane, a Hard-type, or a Flight Model.
  Summons the Omega Zukcrane.
: Activates a magnetic field to wreck all metal objects in its path.
: Produces a Dark Aurora that incinerates anything caught in its path.
: Uses a giant fight bell to cause buildings to collapse via sound waves.
: Uses the nearby fans to invoke winds as strong as hurricanes or generate blade-like gusts.
: Conjures bubbles created from a special liquid that explode on contact.
: Allows Maen to hack into the Pilon Corp Development Department's Microwave Electric Transmitter, activating the Microwave Cannon and rewriting the system to attack people.
: Activates a chalkboard that scratches itself, creating a sound that kills plant life. Though the Executives accidentally ripped the card in two and fixed it, the card only affects vegetables and places Vegataria City in a state of crisis. By the time it is found, R1 Max and R3 use Shovel Striker and Dozer Saver to bring the  blackboard topside and smash it.
: Activates a Zukcrane that uses a nail gun to penetrate the crust under Academia City to bring magma to the surface to cover the city. Used to bring the Rescue Force to the scene and bring out Rescue Max, the Zukcrane managed to get the rescue mecha to fall for its trap and fall towards the magma. However, with the Rescue Phoenix's aid, the Rescue Max escapes and scraps the Zukcrane.
: A Super-Disaster Machine, based on the technology of the Rescue Vehicles and summoned by the "Megaton Crisis" Crisis Card as a last resort. Each Zukcrane model has a unique crisis-causing ability that it dangles until the Rescue Max disables it, leaving it defenseless to a Final Rescue. Only Rescue Max Drill Dozer had the power to scrap this advanced model. Starting at Suzukura to take out Japan, the Omega Zukcrane surfaces after the Rescue Max Drill Dozer scraps the two Zukcranes holding if off. The Omega Zukcrane easily overpowers the Rescue Max in the first round, provoking the Earth Federation to use an X0 Missile to stop it before it could drill into Suzaku Mountain. But after getting Rei and Juri out of it with the Rescue Saver, Hikaru forms the God Striker which overloads the Omeganium before scraping the Omega Zukcrane. The last Flight Model Zukcrane is equipped with a special hard-drying cement that is near unbreakable. Though it came close to taking out the Super Rescue Max Crane, Zero Fire's debut ended with the machine being scrapped.
: A train built by Mataro Madono. Its designs were originally considered as a template for the Mach Train, but Nouvelle Ginza turned them down. Forging an alliance with the Neo Thera and donning the name "Doktor Madu", Madono hijacks the Mach Train with the intent of causing a train wreck strong enough to level the city where Nouvelle Ginza's main branch is located. Once the Rescue Force manages to get the Mach Train passengers to safety, Rescue Striker and Rescue Diver combine into Jet Vehicle Mode to pursue the Metal Train. The Metal Train releases its hold on the Mach Train to assume its  mode in an attempt to overpower the Rescue Force before attacking the city. However, Jet Vehicle Mode reconfigures into Super Rescue Max to turn the tables, using Drill Blaster to shatter the Snake Train. Doktor Madu evades death, but is subsequently handed over to the Akebono authorities.
: A fire-based life form originally created by San to attack the headquarters for World Financial Services Agency.
: A bacteriological weapon created by San to disassemble metal-based things it infects from the inside out, having a side effect that has infected humans move in slow motion before a vaccine is developed to kill off the bacteria. A new strain of the bacteria, is later introduced on those gathered for the Asia Counter-Super-Disaster Summit, infecting only humans in the form of chills, fever, and diarrhea before becoming fatal within an hour. Though a vaccine was developed to cure the infected, the remaining Yuruyuru Bacteria 2 gathers within a mountain and converges into a giant monster that attempts to cause a landslide until Rescue Saver and Drill Striker destroy it.
: A bacteriological weapon created by Maen to stiffen anything thing it infects from humans to machines except wax. Maare uses the Dark Commander to spread them across the city in hopes of freezing the Rescue Force in place before they can begin the actual Super-Disaster.  However, R1 and R2 manage to spread the vaccine across the city and cure the infected.
: Secretly built by the Pilon Corporation to be the first of their manufactured weapons, it is activated by Maen when she hacks into the Development Department. Until Maare's control, she uses the Cannon to try and take out the Rescue Max while it is saving the people underneath the building. Once given the word, the Rescue Max Drill Dozer scraps the Microwave Cannon.
: A bacteriological weapon created by Maen based on Clownfish DNA that turns infected men into women and thus removes humanity's ability to procreate. As part of a test at Kazaki Park, they turn Hikaru and Kyosuke into women. With the rest of the test a complete success, Maare activates the End Crisis Maker to spread the virus across the city with Ishiguro among the inflicted. With Hikaru and Kyosuke too feminine to be of any help, Rei and Juri pilot the Super Rescue Max as the virus takes the form of a giant monster clownfish. Once the monster is killed and the Crisis Maker is destroyed, Rei disburses the vaccine to return all the feminized men back to normal.
Geyser Dragon (46): A monster made of geyser water formed by the water orb containing a Crisis Maker, it overwhelms the Super Rescue Max Crane during the Kiyoizawa incident until its core is destroyed by the robot.
Plasma man (47): A monster made of plasma energy remote controlled by a Crisis Maker, able to fry any electric-based machine on touch. Though it ran off when the Executives accidentally lost the directions to the Crisis Maker, the Plasma Man resumed its attack at Nouveau Tokyo area where Teppei and his dad were going to take the Mach Train. It is then destroyed by the Super Rescue Max.
Gas (51): Unintentionally released into a school by the drained Executives, the gas affects people by playing on their fears. The gas is eventually neutralized by the Rescue Striker as it starts to manifest in the atmosphere.

Episodes

Rescue the Mach Train!
 opened in theaters on December 20, 2008. The short  was shown alongside the film.

Cast
Hikaru Todoroki/R1:  
Kyosuke Jinrai/R2:  (FLAME)
Rei Kozuki/R3: 
Juri Shiraki/R4, Eri Haseyama: 
Eiji Ishiguro/R5: 
Captain General/RU: 
Obuchi/Daen (Voice): 
Maare (Voice):  (Yasuda Dai Circus)
San (Voice):  (Yasuda Dai Circus)
Sica (Voice): HIRO (Yasuda Dai Circus)
Maen, Dark Commander (Voice): 
Batsu (Voice): 
Core Striker, Core Saver, Rescue Commander (Voice): 
Narrator:

Guest Actors
Naomi Okamura: 
Ritsuko Kanzaki: 
Bunji Saeki: 
Ryuji: 
Kirara Amamiya:

Suit actors
R1: 
R2: 
R3: 
R4, Maare: 
R4: 
R5, R2: 
San: 
Sica: 
Maen:

Songs
Opening themes
"STORY"
Lyrics: HAYATO/TAKA
Composition: KIKU
Arrangement: camino
Artist: camino
Episodes: 1-26
The single for "STORY" included the "TV edit" for the song as well as a full-length version of the song with different lyrics.

Lyrics: HAYATO/TAKA
Composition: TAKA
Arrangement: camino
Artist: camino
Episodes: 27-51

Ending themes

Lyrics & Composition: 
Arrangement: TRIPLANE & 
Artist: TRIPLANE
Episodes: 1-26
TRIPLANE had previously released a version of "Kokoro Hakobu" on their second album, . The TV arrangement of the song was released on their next single, on July 16, 2008.

Lyrics & Composition: 
Arrangement: 
Artist: 
Episodes: 27-44
"Arigatō" is included on Yusaku Kiyama's mini-album . It is his first album, following the release of his first single, "home."

Lyrics: HAMMER & Mago & JIN
Composition & Arrangement: Jin
Artist: 2BACKKA
Episodes: 45-51

Movie theme
"ONE WAY TO ROCK!!"
Lyrics: HAYATO
Composition: KIKU
Arrangement: camino
Artist: camino

Syndication

While Tomica Hero: Rescue Force initially aired on TV Aichi, it is syndicated on TV Tokyo Network, Iwate Menkoi Television, Higashinippon Broadcasting, Fukushima Central Television, The Niigata Television Network 21, Nagano Broadcasting Systems, TV Shizuoka, Ehime Asahi Television, Nagasaki Broadcasting Company, Ryukyu Asahi Broadcasting, and Biwako Broadcasting.

References

External links 
 Rescue Force at TV Aichi
 Rescue Force at Takara-Tomy

|-

Tokusatsu television series
Takara Tomy